Coon Creek is a stream in Knox County in the U.S. state of Missouri. It is a tributary of the South Fork Fabius River.

Coon Creek was named for the abundance of raccoons in the area.

See also
List of rivers of Missouri

References

Rivers of Knox County, Missouri
Rivers of Missouri